The Evangeline Bank and Trust Company, also known as Ville Platte City Hall, is a two-story building with elements of Classical Revival style located at 342 West Main Street in Ville Platte in Evangeline Parish, Louisiana.

Built in 191, it is a masonry building.  It was deemed significant "as the town of Ville Platte’s most impressive architectural landmark."

The building was listed on the National Register of Historic Places on September 1, 2005.

See also
National Register of Historic Places listings in Evangeline Parish, Louisiana

References

Bank buildings on the National Register of Historic Places in Louisiana
Neoclassical architecture in Louisiana
Commercial buildings completed in 1913
Evangeline Parish, Louisiana